The 2013–14 season of the Belgian Pro League (also known as Jupiler Pro League for sponsorship reasons) was the 111th season of top-tier football in Belgium. It started on 27 July 2013 with the match between Club Brugge and Charleroi and finished on 18 May 2014 with Anderlecht grabbing their 33rd title due to a 3–1 at home against Lokeren.

During the regular season, Standard Liège started by winning their first nine matches, putting pressure on their main challengers Anderlecht, Club Brugge, Genk and Zulte Waregem. At the halfway point, Genk was closing in on Standard, trailing by one point, but following a series of losses they dropped several places in the standings and eventually they narrowly held on to sixth place and just made it into the title playoffs. Towards the end of the regular season, mainly Club Brugge proved to be a threat as they had narrowed the gap to Standard, closing in to only four points.

The playoffs started with Standard leading on 34 points and Club Brugge right behind them on 32. Both Anderlecht (29 points) and Zulte Waregem (27 points) were at that point considered long shots for the title, while Lokeren on 26 and Genk on 23 were considered to be out of contention. Early in the playoffs, Standard immediately beat Anderlecht and knocked them down to eight points behind, seemingly setting up a final title race between them and Club Brugge. Although Standard had been in the lead since the start of the season, they somehow starting struggling, allowing Club Brugge to overtake them in the standings and become the main title favorite with just four games to go. On 4 May 2014, Club Brugge had the chance to permanently knock Anderlecht out of the race, but somehow lost at home against 10 men, putting Standard back into the lead with Anderlecht now a close second. Standard in turn then lost against Club Brugge, putting Anderlecht into the lead with two games to go, a lead which they kept until the end, winning their 33rd title in a season in which they lost no less than 11 games.

The Europa League playoff groups were won by Oostende and Kortrijk, with Oostende overcoming Kortrijk on penalty kicks although they knew they had not been given a licence for European football. As a result, the fourth placed team in the league, Zulte Waregem, were granted access directly.

In the bottom end of the table, Mons started miserably after finishing 7th the previous season, scoring only three points out of their first 15 matches. Their better second half of the season did not help in avoiding the last place. They were thereby forced to play the relegation playoff together with Oud-Heverlee Leuven, who had been struggling to set up a series of decent results, mainly driven by their horrendous away form, drawing only three matches away from home the whole season, while losing all the others. Mons were relegated on 12 April after yet another 2–0 away to OH Leuven, while Leuven themselves faced relegation on 18 May as they could no longer win the Belgian Second Division Final Round. Both OH Leuven and Mons had been playing in the Belgian Pro League for three seasons.

Teams
Following the 2012–13 Belgian Pro League, Beerschot were originally relegated to the 2013–14 Belgian Second Division after losing their relegation playoff series against Cercle Brugge. However, as they went bankrupt, the team folded and would later merge with KFCO Wilrijk playing at the first provincial level (fifth level) of Belgian football to form KFCO Beerschot – Wilrijk. Beerschot is replaced by 2012–13 Belgian Second Division champions Oostende, who returned to the highest level after their relegation during the 2004–05 season.

As Cercle Brugge won the 2013 Belgian Second Division Final Round against Second Division teams Mouscron-Péruwelz, Westerlo and WS Woluwe, they were saved from relegation, causing Oostende to be the only newcomer in the Belgian Pro League for this season.

Stadia and locations

Managerial changes

Regular season

League table

Positions by round
Note: The classification was made after the weekend (or midweek) of each matchday, so postponed matches were only processed at the time they were played to represent the real evolution in standings.

Results

Championship playoff
The points obtained during the regular season were halved (and rounded up) before the start of the playoff. As a result, the teams started with the following points before the playoff: Standard 34 points, Club Brugge 32, Anderlecht 29, Zulte Waregem 27, Lokeren 26 and Genk 23. Had any ties occurred at the end of the playoffs, the half point would have been deducted if it was added. However, as all six teams received the half point bonus, this did not make a difference this season.

Playoff table

Positions by round
Below the positions per round are shown. As teams did not all start with an equal number of points, the initial pre-playoffs positions are also given.

Results

Europa League Playoff
Group A contained the teams finishing the regular season in positions 7, 9, 12 and 14. The teams that finished in positions 8, 10, 11 and 13 were placed in Group B. Oostende held Gent to a 1–1 draw on 26 April and was thereby sure of winning Group A. In Group B, the decision was made on the last matchday when Kortrijk beat Charleroi 2–1 at home on 3 May.

Group A

Group B

Europa League playoff final
The winners of both playoff groups competed in a two-legged match to play the fourth-placed team of the championship playoff, called Testmatch. The winners of this Testmatch were granted entry to the second qualifying round of the 2014–15 UEFA Europa League.

Oostende won on penalties after drawing 4–4 on aggregate.

Testmatches Europa League
The Europa League playoff final was to be played over two legs between Oostende and fourth-place finishers Zulte Waregem, with the winner receiving the right to play in the Second qualifying round of the 2014–15 UEFA Europa League. However, as Oostende did not receive a licence for European football, the match was annulled and Zulte Waregem was awarded the spot directly.

Relegation playoff
The teams finishing in the last two positions faced each other in the relegation playoff. The winner of this playoff played the second division playoff with three Belgian Second Division teams, with the winner playing at the highest level the next season. The loser faced relegation. For finishing 15th, Oud-Heverlee Leuven received the home advantage and an initial lead of 3 points over Mons. Mons was relegated on 12 April as OHL had obtained a lead of 9 points with only 2 matches left. However, Oud-Heverlee Leuven then failed to finish top of the Belgian Second Division Final Round group, ensuring their relegation as well.

The matches in the table below were played from left to right:

Season statistics
Source: Sporza.be and Sport.be Up to and including matches played on 18 May.''

Top scorers

11 goals (2 players)

  Maxime Lestienne (Club Brugge)
  Hans Vanaken (Lokeren)

10 goals (3 players)

  Massimo Bruno (Anderlecht)
  Elimane Coulibaly (Kortrijk)
  Bjorn Ruytinx (OH Leuven)
  Dalibor Veselinović (Waasland-Beveren)

9 goals (4 players)

  Julien Gorius (Genk)
  Rachid Bourabia (Lierse)
  Geoffrey Mujangi Bia (Standard Liège)}
  Idrissa Sylla (Zulte Waregem)

8 goals (5 players)

  Sacha Kljestan (Anderlecht)
  Cédric Fauré (Charleroi)
  Tony Watt (Lierse)
  Tim Matthys (Mons)
  Paul-Jose M'Poku (Standard Liège)

7 goals (6 players)

  Timmy Simons (Club Brugge)
  Hervé Kage (Gent)
  Teddy Chevalier (Kortrijk)
  Mbaye Diagne (Lierse)
  Nill De Pauw (Lokeren)
  Laurent Depoitre (Oostende)

6 goals (10 players)

  Matías Suárez (Anderlecht)
  Jesper Jørgensen (Club Brugge)
  Waldemar Sobota (Club Brugge)
  Thomas Buffel (Genk)
  Ilombe Mboyo (Genk (5) & Gent (1))
  David Destorme (Mechelen)
  Seth de Witte (Mechelen)
  Mads Junker (Mechelen)
  Sébastien Siani (Oostende)
  Jens Naessens (Zulte Waregem)

5 goals (17 players)

  Chancel Mbemba (Anderlecht)
  Dennis Praet (Anderlecht)
  Junior Kabananga (Cercle Brugge)
  Michael Uchebo (Cercle Brugge)
  Sébastien Dewaest (Charleroi)
  Neeskens Kebano (Charleroi)
  Björn Engels (Club Brugge)
  Yassine El Ghanassy (Gent)
  Nicklas Pedersen (Gent)
  Thomas Matton (Kortrijk)
  Junior Dutra (Lokeren)
  Shlomi Arbeitman (Mons)
  Evariste Ngolok (OH Leuven)
  Jonathan Wilmet (Oostende)
  Igor de Camargo (Standard Liège)
  Ivan Tričkovski (Waasland-Beveren)
  Raphaël Cacérès (Zulte Waregem)

4 goals (15 players)

  Cyriac (Anderlecht)
  Guillaume Gillet (Anderlecht)
  Stephen Buyl (Cercle Brugge)
  Clément Tainmont (Charleroi)
  Eiður Guðjohnsen (Club Brugge)
  Lior Refaelov (Club Brugge)
  Bennard Kumordzi (Genk)
  Benito Raman (Kortrijk)
  Hernán Losada (Lierse)
  Jordan Remacle (Lokeren)
  Benjamin Mokulu (Mechelen)
  Jovan Kostovski (OH Leuven)
  Robin Henkens (Waasland-Beveren)
  Sven Kums (Zulte Waregem)
  Ólafur Ingi Skúlason (Zulte Waregem)

3 goals (24 players)

  Frank Acheampong (Anderlecht)
  Andy Najar (Anderlecht)
  Tim Smolders (Cercle Brugge)
  Danijel Milićević (Charleroi)
  Thomas Meunier (Club Brugge)
  Vadis Odjidja-Ofoe (Club Brugge)
  Fabien Camus (Genk)
  Nebojša Pavlović (Kortrijk)
  Jérémy Taravel (Lokeren)
  Wilson Kamavuaka (Mechelen)
  Aleksandar Trajkovski (Mechelen)
  Arnor Angeli (Mons)
  Mohamed Messoudi (OH Leuven)
  Tom Pettersson (OH Leuven)
  Frédéric Brillant (Oostende)
  Fernando Canesin (Oostende)
  Baptiste Schmisser (Oostende)
  Mehdi Carcela (Standard Liège)
  Laurent Ciman (Standard Liège)
  Jelle Van Damme (Standard Liège)
  Renaud Emond (Waasland-Beveren)
  Aboubakar Oumarou (Waasland-Beveren)
  Ibrahima Conté (Zulte Waregem)
  Junior Malanda (Zulte Waregem)

2 goals (39 players)

  Olivier Deschacht (Anderlecht)
  Ronald Vargas (Anderlecht)
  Bart Buysse (Cercle Brugge)
  Gaël Etock (Cercle Brugge)
  Thibaut Van Acker (Cercle Brugge)
  Mohamed Daf (Charleroi)
  Kenneth Houdret (Charleroi)
  Nicolás Castillo (Club Brugge)
  Víctor Vázquez (Club Brugge)
  Sekou Cissé (Genk)
  Kalidou Koulibaly (Genk)
  Siebe Schrijvers (Genk)
  Nana Asare (Gent)
  Carlos Diogo (Gent)
  Christophe Lepoint (Gent)
  Renato Neto (Gent)
  Sloan Privat (Gent)
  Yaya Soumahoro (Gent)
  Ervin Zukanović (Gent)
  Kostadin Hazurov (Lierse)
  Anthony Limbombe (Lierse)
  Dolly Menga (Lierse)
  Wanderson (Lierse)
  Ayanda Patosi (Lokeren)
  Boubacar Diabang (Mechelen)
  Noë Dussenne (Mons)
  Flavien Le Postollec (Mons)
  Joachim Mununga (Mons)
  Karel Geraerts (OH Leuven)
  Ibou (OH Leuven)
  Lukas Van Eenoo (OH Leuven (1) & Cercle Brugge (1))
  Yohan Brouckaert (Oostende)
  Michiel Jonckheere (Oostende)
  Xavier Luissint (Oostende)
  Nyasha Mushekwi (Oostende)
  Julien De Sart (Standard Liège)
  Siebe Blondelle (Waasland-Beveren)
  Róbert Demjan (Waasland-Beveren)
  Karel D'Haene (Zulte Waregem)

1 goal (88 players)

  Demy de Zeeuw (Anderlecht)
  Cheikhou Kouyaté (Anderlecht)
  Fabrice N'Sakala (Anderlecht)
  Bram Nuytinck (Anderlecht)
  Youri Tielemans (Anderlecht)
  Frederik Boi (Cercle Brugge)
  Hans Cornelis (Cercle Brugge)
  Kristof D'haene (Cercle Brugge)
  Gregory Mertens (Cercle Brugge)
  Gaetano Monachello (Cercle Brugge)
  Arne Naudts (Cercle Brugge)
  Stef Wils (Cercle Brugge)
  Guillaume François (Charleroi)
  Jessy Galvez-Lopez (Charleroi)
  Harlem Gnohéré (Charleroi)
  Onur Kaya (Charleroi)
  Abraham Kumedor (Charleroi)
  Dieumerci Ndongala (Charleroi)
  Giuseppe Rossini (Charleroi)
  Enes Sağlık (Charleroi)
  Mourad Satli (Charleroi)
  Jonathan Blondel (Club Brugge)
  Boli Bolingoli-Mbombo (Club Brugge)
  Kehinde Fatai (Club Brugge)
  Tom Høgli (Club Brugge)
  Wang Shangyuan (Club Brugge)
  Benjamin De Ceulaer (Genk)
  Pieter Gerkens (Genk)
  Khaleem Hyland (Genk)
  Steeven Joseph-Monrose (Genk)
  Anele Ngcongca (Genk)
  Derrick Tshimanga (Genk)
  Brecht Dejaegere (Gent)
  Rémi Maréval (Gent)
  Ante Puljić (Gent)
  Brecht Capon (Kortrijk)
  Maxime Chanot (Kortrijk)
  Robert Klaasen (Kortrijk)
  Mustapha Oussalah (Kortrijk)
  Wouter Corstjens (Lierse)
  Ahmed Farag (Lierse)
  Karim Saidi (Lierse)
  Julien Vercauteren (Lierse)
  Eugene Ansah (Lokeren)
  Georgios Galitsios (Lokeren)
  Mijat Marić (Lokeren)
  Denis Odoi (Lokeren)
  Killian Overmeire (Lokeren)
  Koen Persoons (Lokeren)
  Alexander Scholz (Lokeren)
  Maxime Biset (Mechelen)
  Sheldon Bateau (Mechelen)
  Alessandro Cordaro (Mechelen)
  Steven De Petter (Mechelen)
  Abdul-Yakuni Iddi (Mechelen)
  Mats Rits (Mechelen)
  Joachim Van Damme (Mechelen)
  Jordi Vanlerberghe (Mechelen)
  Steve Beleck (Mons)
  Thomas Chatelle (Mons)
  Christophe Diandy (Mons)
  Mustapha Jarju (Mons)
  Grégory Lorenzi (Mons)
  Pieterjan Monteyne (Mons)
  Jérémy Sapina (Mons)
  Richard Soumah (Mons)
  Alessandro Cerigioni (OH Leuven)
  Romain Reynaud (OH Leuven)
  Robson (OH Leuven)
  Niels De Schutter (Oostende)
  Denis Dessaer (Oostende)
  Tom van Imschoot (Oostende)
  Fede Vico (Oostende)
  Frédéric Bulot (Standard Liège)
  Reza Ghoochannejhad (Standard Liège)
  Kanu (Standard Liège)
  William Vainqueur (Standard Liège)
  Karim Belhocine (Waasland-Beveren)
  Mijuško Bojović (Waasland-Beveren)
  Rami Gershon (Waasland-Beveren)
  Fayçal Lebbihi (Waasland-Beveren)
  Miloš Marić (Waasland-Beveren)
  René Sterckx (Waasland-Beveren)
  Franck Berrier (Zulte Waregem)
  Theo Bongonda (Zulte Waregem)
  Mbaye Leye (Zulte Waregem)
  Mamoutou N'Diaye (Zulte Waregem)
  Marvin Pourié (Zulte Waregem)

2 Own goals (1 player)

  Gregory Mertens (Cercle Brugge, scored for Gent and Lierse)

1 Own goal (19 players)

  Chancel Mbemba (Anderlecht, scored for Standard Liège)
  Bram Nuytinck (Anderlecht, scored for Zulte Waregem)
  Laurens De Bock (Club Brugge, scored for Lokeren)
  Jesper Jørgensen (Club Brugge, scored for Kortrijk)
  Thomas Meunier (Club Brugge, scored for Anderlecht)
  Arjan Swinkels (Lierse, scored for Genk)
  Denis Odoi (Lokeren, scored for Anderlecht)
  Koen Persoons (Lokeren, scored for Standard Liège)
  Alexander Scholz (Lokeren, scored for Zulte Waregem)
  Sheldon Bateau (Mechelen, scored for Zulte Waregem)
  Peter Franquart (Mons, scored for Mechelen)
  Nicolas Timmermans (Mons, scored for Mechelen)
  Ludovic Buysens (OH Leuven, scored for Standard Liège)
  Niels De Schutter (Oostende, scored for Gent)
  Jordan Lukaku (Oostende, scored for OH Leuven)
  Kanu (Standard Liège, scored for Anderlecht)
  Daniel Opare (Standard Liège, scored for Lokeren)
  Mijuško Bojović (Waasland-Beveren, scored for OH Leuven)
  Junior Malanda (Zulte Waregem, scored for Anderlecht)

Hat-tricks

References 

Belgian Pro League seasons
Belgian Pro League
1